In mathematics, a k-hyperperfect number is a natural number n for which the equality n = 1 + k(σ(n)  − n  − 1) holds, where σ(n) is the divisor function (i.e., the sum of all positive divisors of n). A hyperperfect number is a k-hyperperfect number for some integer k. Hyperperfect numbers generalize perfect numbers, which are 1-hyperperfect.

The first few numbers in the sequence of k-hyperperfect numbers are 6, 21, 28, 301, 325, 496, 697, ... , with the corresponding values of k being 1, 2, 1, 6, 3, 1, 12, ... . The first few k-hyperperfect numbers that are not perfect are 21, 301, 325, 697, 1333, ... .

List of hyperperfect numbers
The following table lists the first few k-hyperperfect numbers for some values of k, together with the sequence number in the On-Line Encyclopedia of Integer Sequences (OEIS) of the sequence of k-hyperperfect numbers:

It can be shown that if k > 1 is an odd integer and p = (3k + 1) / 2 and q = 3k + 4 are prime numbers, then p²q is k-hyperperfect; Judson S. McCranie has conjectured in 2000 that all k-hyperperfect numbers for odd k > 1 are of this form, but the hypothesis has not been proven so far. Furthermore, it can be proven that if p ≠ q are odd primes and k is an integer such that k(p + q) = pq - 1, then pq is k-hyperperfect.

It is also possible to show that if k > 0 and p = k + 1 is prime, then for all i > 1 such that q = pi − p + 1 is prime, n = pi − 1q is k-hyperperfect. The following table lists known values of k and corresponding values of i for which n is k-hyperperfect:

Hyperdeficiency 

The newly introduced mathematical concept of hyperdeficiency is related to the hyperperfect numbers.

Definition (Minoli 2010): For any integer n and for integer k, define the k-hyperdeficiency (or simply the hyperdeficiency) for the number n as

    δk(n) = n(k+1) +(k-1) – kσ(n)

A number n is said to be k-hyperdeficient if δk(n) > 0.

Note that for k=1 one gets δ1(n)= 2n–σ(n), which is the standard traditional definition of deficiency.

Lemma: A number n is k-hyperperfect (including k=1) if and only if the k-hyperdeficiency of n, δk(n) = 0.
 
Lemma: A number n is k-hyperperfect (including k=1) if and only if for some k, δk-j(n) = -δk+j(n) for at least one j > 0.

References

Further reading

Articles 

 .
 .
 .
 .
 .
 .
 .
 . 
 .

Books 

 Daniel Minoli, Voice over MPLS, McGraw-Hill, New York, NY, 2002,  (p. 114-134)

External links 
 MathWorld: Hyperperfect number
 A long list of hyperperfect numbers under Data

Arithmetic dynamics
Divisor function
Integer sequences
Perfect numbers